A constitutional referendum was held in French Togoland as part of the wider French referendum. Contrasting  in other French territories, voting was restricted to French citizens, with only 2,217 people able to vote out of population of 1,284,000.

Results

References

1958
1958 in French Togoland
1958 referendums
September 1958 events in Africa